Xuxa Park was a Brazilian children's television series directed by Marlene Mattos, and hosted by Xuxa Meneghel. It was aired on Globo from 4 June 1994 to 6 January 2001. Originally,the show was pretend to be the Brazilian version of Xuxa Park produced by Spain's Tele5 in 1992.

The show is highlighted because is the comeback of the presenter to host to dedicate herself exclusively to children and young people on her home country. The decision was taken after the homonym Xuxa (1993) amid a health crisis,being a failure of the audience either by the time, or by the theme or by the public. The program was broadcast on Sunday afternoons and focused on the family.
Occupying Saturday morning time slot, the program featured many elements from their previous television shows,as the games, musical numbers, and cartoons. The end of the program is marked by a tragedy of great proportions, when a fire devastates the studio where the program was recorded.
Unfortunately, it occurred on January 6, 2001, during the recording of an edition that was scheduled to be shown on February 24 of that same year.
As the stage and the studio were full of children and the presenter's team, it was emptied in 5 minutes. However, several people were injured and both the broadcaster and the presenter jointly decided for its ending.and in the end, eight programs that had already been recorded and edited to go on air were discarded.

History

Background 
Xuxa Park was hosted by Brazilian superstar and multimedia Xuxa Meneghel, that became wildly popular during the 80's and 90's with young viewers around Latin America and the Spain. While hailed by many for her charisma, talent and special talent actions when dealing with children and young people.Since the beging of her carrer,as model,she has also been a controversial figure due to her having previously posed for a Playboy magazine centerfold and also having played a prostitute or an extra in movies and another television shows,what some categorize as a "soft porn" shows and movies.This program is also marked by the fact that she also made the first career transition, when one of the segments was dismembered to give rise to Planeta Xuxa, which was another program dedicated to older and young adults.On this segment called Xuxa Hits in which it functioned as a discotheque where the main artists on the hit charts on popular radio stations in the country performed their songs.On this segments, among another things,Xuxa acted as interview with musical performers,actors and among many "more adult things" are maded.

The show's stage was based on an amusement park and had several versions during the seven or eight seasons that it was on air. However, the only element that remained in it was the spaceship that is the presenter's trademark until today and just like Xou da Xuxa, she got off it to start the program and got on it to end it.Normally, the program consisted of 7 or 8 intervals in which games, musical, theatrical, circus and cultural attractions, correspondence reading, interviews and other interests are inclued.

Production 
During the first five seasonsXuxa Park was recorded entirely in Teatro Fênix, in the neighborhood of the Jardim Botânico in Rio de Janeiro.Called as Crystal Palace,the initial scenario housed a modern amusement park, full of lights, tunnels, spacecrafts and toys that turned in all directions. Xuxa down a lift-shaped flying saucer. In 1995 season, the scenario have been modified. The Crystal Palace, however, continued to be the main reference.

Starting on September 1999, the three last seasons ofXuxa Park.The stage and all elements were redesigned.Due the fact that the program began to be recorded in Projac, in a bigger area than the Theater space, and the whole studio space was used, leaving only the lateral access. The scene had again a futuristic style and its design was based on the proximity of the new millennium.

Format 
Xuxa Park was divided into to seven fto eight blocks, with two to four hours long and with mixed games, musical numbers and cartoons. The program display time varied over the years. In January 1995, Xuxa Park began to share Saturday morning with the children's TV Colosso (1993), displayed from 10:45. In April 1995, the time has been changed to 9:50 a.m.; and in July 1996, the program was being transmitted from 8am.

The opening block Xuxa Park was dedicated to cartoons.The second and third blocks were dedicated to the games. In the first two seasons, competitions were between schools in the city of Rio de Janeiro and only in the 1996 season, competition between boys and girls was implemented.In the end of the third block, the Pequenas Crianças, Grandes Talentos, showed children from all over the Brazil, dancing or showing some skill. it always had variations in its formatting, but it always ended with the talk show   Canta, Brasil, in which every week Xuxa interviewed a Brazilian idol. The fifth block was dedicated again to end the games segment with the final tests. In the sixth and seventh blocks, the program had the Xuxa Hits, Music charts with the singers and the most played songs of the season.Later this blocks were desmembered and gived origins to Planeta Xuxa.

Cast 
In the same way as the previous programs, the cast included Paquitas and the twins Roberta and Mariana Richard, the Irmãs Metralha; and the actor Armando Moraes who played the Praga caracter,a male turtle that irritated the presenter gained a new character, an elf that guarded the abandoned mine where the amusement park was hidden during the first seasons.He resurrected Praga during the 1996 season, when the presenter celebrated her 10 years on Rede Globo. However, in the following season he did not appear anymore.Another character that reappeared from the presenter's old programs was the doll "Moderninho" manipulated by Reinaldo Weismann who helped the presenter in reading the audience's letters and acted during the 1997 season when the presenter was pregnant as her personal assistent and comebacked latter interacting with the public and helping the presenter at times.At the two last seasons.Weismann acted along the actress actress Marisa Leal to give life to the sibilings Xuxinha and Guto.A specific caracter created for the show was the Gênio Eugênio (Paolo Pacelli) who which also later disappeared.On the final seasons, Xuxa even gained the support of dancer Adriana Bombom, who was moved from Planeta Xuxa to Xuxa Park to help the Paquitas after some members had left the group.Along all the eight seasons,Xuxa gained support from some former Paquitas members,as Andreia Sorvetão and Andreia Faria recorded some specific external segments of the program such as visits to museums,musical events,theater performances or municipal parks.Sometimes they acted as  backstage correspondents of the show itself and the Agendinha (Calendar) block in which the cultural events of the week in question were announced.

Flash fire 

The program was canceled after a tragic fire that occurred on 11 January 2001.

References

Bibliography 
Dicionário da TV Globo (Vol. 1 - Dramaturgia e Entretenimento) - Categoria Entretenimento: page. 748 / Jorge Zahar Editora, Rio de Janeiro.

External links
 Xuxa Park (in Portuguese) in the Xuxa.com

Rede Globo original programming
Brazilian children's television series
1994 Brazilian television series debuts
2001 Brazilian television series endings
1990s Brazilian music television series
Portuguese-language television shows
Brazilian music television series
1990s Brazilian television series
2000s Brazilian television series
Brazilian television series
Xuxa